Bambi a.d. is a food manufacturing company headquartered in Požarevac, Serbia. One of its signature products is a biscuit called Plazma, also known as Lane outside of former Yugoslavia.

History

The company was founded in 1967 on initiative of Momčilo Filipović and later Petar Tutavac, with support of the League of Communists of Yugoslavia. From the start, the company's focus was on manufacturing biscuits made out of domestically grown grains with an emphasis on healthy food. Within the first ten years of its existence the company had 230 full-time employees and manufactured 3,100 tons of products. In 1979 it received its first award for consistency in quality. Over the years the company grew and expanded to different regions of former Yugoslavia.

In 1968, the company started production of their now famous Plazma biscuit, originally a variation of Plasmon biscuits, and today it is one of their best selling products. In 1990 the company started production of another well-known product called Grandma's cookie (in Serbian, Bakin kolač) type of waffle, which is no longer produced. In 1997 the company was the first in the country to receive international certificate for the standard in quality management ISO 9001 in food industry.

In mid-2004 Bambi became part of the Danube Foods Group, managed by Salford Investment Fund. In February 2015, Salford Investment Fund sold their interests in Bambi to Mid Europa Partners. Since 2015, assets of Mid Europe Partners in Serbia which include Bambi, Knjaz Miloš and Imlek, are managed by "Moji Brendovi" consultant firm.

In mid-2017, the company changed its logo and introduced new products. As of 2018, Bambi is one of the largest food companies in Serbia.

On 18 February 2019, the Coca-Cola HBC announced a deal valued at €260 million to acquire Bambi from Mid Europa Partners.

References

External links
 

1967 establishments in Serbia
2004 mergers and acquisitions
2019 mergers and acquisitions
Companies based in Požarevac
Food and drink companies of Serbia
Food and drink companies established in 1967
Serbian brands
Serbian chocolate companies